Llanos de Challe National Park is located on the Pacific coast of the Atacama Region, Chile. The park's mountains are moistened by the Camanchaca, creating a fog and mist-fed ecosystem called lomas (Spanish for "hills."). The park is one of the southernmost locations of the lomas which are scattered along the coastal desert from northern Chile to northern Peru. The highest elevation in the park is Cerro Negro at 950 m.

This fragile coastal desert ecosystem is habitat for rare and beautiful plants species, including the threatened Leontochir ovallei, known locally as Garra de León. In addition to, cactus are abundant in the park.

The park is one of the best place for contemplating the natural phenomenon known as  desierto florido (flowery desert), which occurs occasionally as a consequence of El Niño-Southern Oscillation.

The park has the largest population of guanacos in the Atacama Region. Park's seashore and surrounding area feature unspoiled white sand beaches and a coastal wetland, which shelters common moorhens, red-gartered coots, black-necked swans and flamingos.

References
 Parque Nacional Llanos de Challe

Protected areas of Atacama Region
National parks of Chile
Coasts of Atacama Region
Protected areas established in 1994